The 1962 French Grand Prix was a Formula One motor race held at Rouen-Les-Essarts on 8 July 1962. It was race 4 of 9 in both the 1962 World Championship of Drivers and the 1962 International Cup for Formula One Manufacturers. The race was won by Dan Gurney, his first Formula One victory, driving a Porsche, that company's only win as a constructor in a Formula One championship race coming after three years of racing. It was the third time that the French Grand Prix was held at Rouen, last time being 1957.

Race
Phil Hill, running second in the championship, was in the stands with a camera around his neck; a metalworkers' strike in Italy meant that Ferrari could not take part. This left Graham Hill the fastest on track, taking the lead at the start and also setting a new lap record. The leading pack also included John Surtees (Lola), Jim Clark (Lotus), and Bruce McLaren (Cooper). These four pulled steadily away from Jack Brabham (Lotus) and Dan Gurney (Porsche). After only nine laps Brabham was out of the race with a broken rear suspension, while McLaren lost fourth gear and spun off the track, rejoining the race far down the field. Surtees retired four laps later with ignition problems, but was later back on the track in eighth place. Hill had pulled out a twenty-second lead ahead of Clark, but on the thirtieth lap he made contact with Jackie Lewis' Cooper when lapping him, allowing Clark to pass. Hill gave chase, netting the lap record, and re-took the lead on lap 33. On the next lap, Clark retired with a broken front suspension. Hill and BRM looked sure to win, but on lap 42 he retired in the hairpin with fuel injection and throttle linkage troubles; he lost several laps and ended up in last place after also having stopped in the hairpin to pick up the engine cover that he had left behind during his earlier visit there.

All of a sudden Gurney found himself in the lead, he made no mistakes and gained what was to be Porsche's only Grand Prix victory with their own car. Tony Maggs had second-place handed to him in what was only his second race in a V8 Cooper, while Surtees' Lola kept giving him trouble. With only fourth gear left, he was passed by Richie Ginther on the 43rd lap. Ginther's car had refused to start, setting him a half lap back at the start, but as cars ahead of him all began to break he drove harder and harder. His troubles were not over, however, with five laps left his throttle wire snapped and he had to control it with his hand - rather troublesome since his BRM's gear shifter was also on the right hand side. McLaren was forced to make another pit stop, but managed to get by the troubled Surtees on the last lap. The last points-scoring position went to the ever-steady Carel Godin de Beaufort in his uncompetitive Porsche 718 from 1961.

Other contenders were Jo Bonnier, who had gearbox and engine troubles. He later retired with fuel starvation, but got the car started and was classified as the last finisher, in tenth. Maurice Trintignant had to make a number of pit stops in his Rob Walker Lotus 24. Trevor Taylor had not been able to practice and was taking it comparatively easy when his throttle return spring broke, leaving it fully open. After a pit stop, he finished eighth, six laps down. A rather confusing race ended even worse - Surtees was trying to eke his crippled car into the pits but was hindered by a wall of gendarmes, who were refusing to move. Trintignant moved over to the left, but Taylor arrived at a high speed and rear-ended Trintignant. Both cars ended up in the hay bales, badly damaged, but amazingly no one was injured.

At the end, Phil Hill took his countryman Gurney aside and thanked him for "driving so well for him", as both of his closest competitors ended the race without any points.

Classification

Qualifying

Race

 Scuderia Ferrari withdrew from the event, and their allocated numbers of 2, 4 and 6 were not used. No drivers were named by the team as having been entered.

Championship standings after the race

Drivers' Championship standings

Constructors' Championship standings

 Notes: Only the top five positions are included for both sets of standings.

References

French Grand Prix
French Grand Prix
French Grand Prix
French Grand Prix